The U.S. Highway System in Louisiana consists of  of mainline highway routes and  of special routes (both figures including concurrencies) that are constructed and maintained by the Louisiana Department of Transportation and Development (La DOTD).



Mainline routes

Current special routes

Former special routes

See also

References

External links
Maps / GIS Data Homepage, Louisiana Department of Transportation and Development

 
U.S. Highways